is a fictional character created by Masashi Kishimoto who first appears in the finale of the manga series Naruto as the son of the protagonist Naruto Uzumaki and Hinata Uzumaki. He later appears as the main protagonist in the 2015 anime film Boruto: Naruto the Movie where he is training as a ninja to surpass his father, the leader of the ninja village Konohagakure and also being mentored by his father's best friend and rival, Sasuke Uchiha. Boruto also serves as a protagonist in the manga and anime series Boruto: Naruto Next Generations. The manga starts off with the retelling of the Boruto film, while the anime begins with his childhood in the ninja academy where he meets his future teammates—Sarada Uchiha and Mitsuki—as well as his teacher, Konohamaru Sarutobi. The character has also appeared in video games, starting with Naruto Shippuden: Ultimate Ninja Storm 4.

Despite Boruto's physical designs being similar to Naruto when he was young, their personalities are developed differently. Boruto's relationship with his father reflects Kishimoto's relationship with his children. On the other hand, the manga primarily focuses on his misrealationship with his adoptive brother Kawaki as artist Mikio Ikemoto wants the audience to look forward to their development. In the Japanese version, Boruto is voiced by Kokoro Kikuchi in The Last: Naruto the Movie and by Yūko Sanpei in all subsequent appearances. Sanpei enjoyed doing the work of Boruto's acting, finding him endearing. In the English version, he is voiced by Amanda C. Miller.

Boruto's character has received mixed critical responses. His relationship with his father has been criticized due to reviewers finding the concept overused in the Naruto manga. In Boruto: Naruto the Movie, his development was praised due to his action scenes and how he understood his father's actions. The two voices provided for him in Japanese and English also received good response.

Creation and conception
Masashi Kishimoto created Boruto in 2013 when the manga Naruto was at its climax. The motivation for the creation was him wanting Naruto Uzumaki to become a father when the manga ends. In the finale of Naruto, Boruto makes a prank in the mountain of Konoha that shows all its leaders, the Hokages. Kishimoto wanted Boruto to act like his father, but at the same time, have differences between each other. Despite not wishing to reveal much about Boruto due to developments of Boruto: Naruto Next Generations, he added that Boruto is not as direct as Naruto. Boruto's first name is a reference to his first cousin once removed Neji Hyuga as an homage to his death in Naruto while protecting both of Boruto's parents. In Boruto: Naruto the Movie, Kishimoto developed Boruto and Naruto's relationship from his relationship with his sons. He wanted the film to depict the father and son relationship between Boruto and Naruto. The film's theme song,  by Kana-Boon, serves as a reference to Boruto. One of the singers of the band stated that it reflects how the character constantly changes from the beginning to the end of the story.

Boruto's mentorship by Naruto's rival and best friend Sasuke Uchiha was influenced due to the latter having few appearances in the Naruto movies. Kishimoto decided that he wanted Sasuke to have a major role in Boruto: Naruto the Movie, which he wrote. In the film, Sasuke becomes the teacher of Naruto's first son, Boruto, inspired by Piccolo from the Dragon Ball manga series by Akira Toriyama. A former enemy of Dragon Ball protagonist Goku, Piccolo becomes the teacher of Goku's first son, Gohan. Boruto anime and film director Hiroyuki Yamashita said that when first seeing the character in Sarada Uchiha's spin-off, he liked his character. In the making of the Boruto film, Yamashita said some scenes regarding to Boruto were removed due to time constraints such as one of the character's interactions with his father as well as another interaction between Boruto and Sarada. A difficult scene for the staff was the use of Boruto's  technique which had to disappear shortly after being used and then appearing again in an attack. The scene in which Naruto passes his son all of his chakra to increase his Rasengan was carefully storyboarded in the film.

Although Boruto is the protagonist of Next Generations series, Ikemoto stated in early 2019 that the relationship between Boruto and Kawaki will be the most important point in the story as the manga is aimed to reach the flashforward scene from the first chapter where both characters start fighting against each other. In December 2020, Ikemoto stated that the anime would make further progress in regards to Kawaki's and Boruto's meeting. However, he still refrained from explaining the flashforward where the manga started. Ikemoto stated that in future chapters, there will be revealed more hints about the flashforward such as their growth, why they become hostile.

Design

In designing the character, Kishimoto intended Boruto to be similar to his father but at the same time avoided facial similarities in the eyes and cheeks due to the fact Naruto had the Nine-Tailed Demon Fox, Kurama, sealed inside him unlike his son. Additionally, he gave him a simpler costume than Naruto's original one that would yet remain the symbol of the Uzumaki clan. The author purposefully let Boruto wear his clothes casually by making him wear his jacket unzipped since he found it suitable for the character's personality. For the finale of the manga, Kishimoto originally intended to give Boruto the Byakugan, an eye technique which he would inherit from his mother Hinata Hyuga. However, the author forgot about it and instead gave him an unknown eye technique.

In the first few pages of the first chapter Boruto: Naruto Next Generations, an encounter between an older teenage Boruto against another one named Kawaki was briefly shown as a flashforward. The purpose was to attract more fans so they could look forward to the battle as it has a chaotic state to it. The battle against Kawaki was shown instead in the first chapter rather than Sasuke's one against Kinshiki Otsutsuki from the Boruto film to generate a different impact within the fans despite sharing the same storyline. Boruto's teenage design was first illustrated in little time. As a result, Mikio Ikemoto stated that once Boruto reached this moment, the older protagonist's design might change. As the story in the manga progresses, Boruto's facial expressions change when interacting with other character; with the friendly Tento, Boruto's eyes are shown bigger due to the portrayal of Boruto's childish personality. However, upon meeting Kawaki, Boruto's eyes are illustrated smaller due to the author's intent to show a more rebellious take on Boruto.

Due to the staff of the Naruto anime referring to Naruto and Sasuke as "legendary characters", anime developers Pierrot aim to carefully portray Boruto and his friends, the "new generation", as the new protagonists. They also seek to have them developed as the previous generation. However, Kishimoto is concerned about how Boruto and his friends could reach Naruto and Sasuke's strength as he finds it repetitive. Ikemoto stated that Boruto's look is predetermined by the storyline so the author instead could not draw the character on his own completely. However, the scene from the 9th chapter where Boruto creates a Rasengan with his father left a big impression on him, believing it was important for the storyline.

Voice actors

In the Japanese version, he was voiced by Kokoro Kikuchi in The Last as a toddler; for the Boruto film and anime, he is voiced by Yūko Sanpei. Sanpei has been a fan of the Naruto manga series ever since she was young. While identifying herself with Naruto Uzumaki's character, the actress noted the bond between her and Naruto became stronger when learning she would voice her son. As a result, once learning she got the role for Boruto's character, Sanpei bought the entire Naruto manga series despite already having it to prepare for the Boruto film. Sanpei was thankful for being offered this position and joked about how Junko Takeuchi became a "father" as her voice role was Naruto. Initially, Sanpei recalls having difficulties voicing Boruto; when she received her script for the film, she began to understand Boruto's concept as the boy who loves his father dearly, which helped her voice the character better. Please with the film Boruto, Sanpei asked Kishimoto to make another one which resulted in Kishimoto asking her to let him rest for another one.

In the English version, he was voiced by Maile Flanagan in The Last: Naruto the Movie film as a toddler and Amanda C. Miller in the Boruto film as a teenager. Boruto is the first main character Miller has ever voiced.  While enjoying the work she does as Boruto's English voice, she stated she felt stress about it due to how important her character is considering his role in the story. Miller and the other Boruto English voice actors felt honored to play the characters based on how large the franchise is. Flanagan and Miller found the two family members similar in nature despite having different backgrounds.

Appearances

In Naruto and stand alone works
First appearing in Narutos finale, Boruto is a child who attends Konoha's ninja academy and often takes care of his sister, Himawari Uzumaki. Like Naruto, Boruto commits mischief to get attention, but for different reasons. Due to his father becoming the Hokage (the leader of Konoha), he does not spend any time with him as he used to. He makes a brief appearance in Naruto: The Seventh Hokage and the Scarlet Spring, where he gives a meal to his comrade Sarada Uchiha to pass on to his father; she becomes motivated to become the Hokage after the day she had. 
In the 2015 film Boruto: Naruto the Movie, and its retellings, Boruto joins the Chunin examinations while gradually becoming frustrated by Naruto putting the village ahead of their family. Boruto ends up meeting his father's best friend and rival, Sarada's father Sasuke Uchiha, and managed to become his apprentice after learning to use the Rasengan while accidentally creating new variation of it. But when the exams commence, Boruto cheats causing his disqualification. As this happens, Naruto is captured by Momoshiki Otsutsuki while protecting their village from the alien's attack. Boruto realizes the error of his ways and joins Sasuke and the Kage to save Naruto. With the help of Naruto and Sasuke, Boruto defeats the enemy Momoshiki with his Rasengan. Although he resented the Hokage position, Boruto becomes resolute to become strong to protect his village's leader in the same way as Sasuke and entrusts Sarada to be a future Hokage instead of himself. Boruto also reprises his role in the novel adaptation of the movie, as well as part of an omake from the manga Sasuke Uchiha's Sharingan Legend where he trains with the title character.

In Boruto: Naruto Next Generations
While the movie and manga open to Boruto after his graduation from the Ninja Academy, the anime adaptation shows him when still attending the school. Boruto manifests an Eye Technique called "Jōgan" or that allows him to see people's contaminated chakra. This enables him to solve the mystery of a "Ghost" corrupting fellow villagers alongside his friends, by finding the culprit. Boruto and his friends take a trip to the village of Kirigakure, befriending the young ninja Kagura Karatachi while stopping a coup by loyalists of their village's horrific Blood Mist traditions. Boruto later graduates and forms the new "Team 7" alongside Sarada and Mitsuki under the leadership of Konohamaru Sarutobi, and they start taking ninja missions. He is also present in two original video animations: one where he indirectly causes his father to be knocked out after accidentally breaking Himawari's doll, and another where Team Konohamaru is sent to stop an apparent thief.

After the Momoshiki fight, Boruto becomes a bodyguard to the Fire Feudal Lord's son Tentō Madoka, befriending the boy while teaching him ninjutsu. Boruto later learns of the existence of a group known as "Kara", and he and his team meet a former Kara member named Kawaki, who is revealed in the series opening scene to become his enemy when the two are older. As Boruto befriends Kawaki, the two learn of Kara's plans, and the consequences of possessing the Karma. During a fight against a Kara member, Boro, Boruto's Karma causes him to be possessed by Momoshiki who seeks to take over his body through the Karma.

When Isshiki Otsutsuki invades the village, Boruto uses the Karma to send him to another dimension where he, Kawaki, Naruto and Sasuke manage to defeat him. Shortly afterward, Momoshiki possesses Boruto again and tries to kill Sasuke, managing to destroy his Rinnegan. The wounded Sasuke and Kawaki manage to fight Momoshiki until the young ninja recovers his own self. Still conflicted with the Otsutsuki taking part of their bodies with the Karma, Boruto and Kawaki decide to investigate the Kara agent Code to eliminate their curse. Kawaki unleashes his own Karma to kill Boruto while being controlled by Momoshiki. However, Momoshiki merges with Boruto so that he will not be erased permanently.

In other media
Outside manga and anime, Boruto also appears in the fighting game Naruto Shippuden: Ultimate Ninja Storm 4, first only in the ending and playable in the expansion pack Road to Boruto. Following Momoshiki's defeat, Boruto can fight against Naruto. Although Boruto loses, his father states he is proud of how much he developed his skills, pleasing Boruto. In 2019, CyberConnect2 CEO Hiroshi Matsuyama received multiple requests by fans to develop another Storm game but claimed that this was meant to be the final game in the series. Nevertheless, he claims Bandai Visual is up to decide if the developers should develop a new series of games focused on Boruto. He appears in the video game Naruto to Boruto: Shinobi Striker as a playable character, as well as Naruto x Boruto: Ninja Voltage. He is also featured in the Boruto light novels.

Reception

Critical
Critical reception to Boruto's character has been generally mixed. Upon first seeing him Ramsey Isler from IGN found him too similar to his father. While comparing Boruto's traits to main characters often seen in other manga series, McNulty felt that Boruto's growth across the anime series helped to make him more likable. On the other hand, Andy Hanley from UK Anime Network said despite his similar design and actions to his father Naruto, Boruto is not like him and has a different personality. Amy McNulty from Anime News Network and Hanley enjoyed Boruto's relationship with his father Naruto due to the differences in their childhoods and how that becomes the focus of the film Boruto: Naruto the Movie. McNulty also liked how Boruto develops as he became afraid of his father's fate during an attack from the antagonist. Richard Eisenbeis from Kotaku was critical to Boruto's development, as he felt that his bond with his father at the end of the Boruto film was unthinkable and weak. In a review from the manga, Nick Smith from ICv2 found Boruto as the weak part of the series due to his personality that contrasted the Naruto in the original Naruto series.  Alexandria Hill from Otaku USA enjoyed Boruto's fight against the film's villain, Momoshiki, and his team-up with Naruto and Sasuke. Chris Zimmerman from DVD Talk noted how the writers fairly conceived Boruto's poor relationship with his father and how it improves during the climax of the film. Leroy Douresseaux liked how Boruto's character has already started development by the second volume of the series. For the anime, Beveridge remarked Boruto's characterization which he felt was superior to the one from the manga.

Critics still enjoyed Boruto's growth, comparing his initial childish act to a more mature teenager with notable idealism. McNulty expressed joy in how the viewer of the Boruto anime gets to see Boruto's days in the ninja academy which Naruto briefly showed and how Boruto does not have the same behavior as his father when being a child. Anime Now felt Boruto's first enemies were more lighthearted than his predecessors. Thais Valdivia from Hobby Consolas stated that while viewers of the film may initially dislike Boruto's personality, his character arc helps to make him more appealing adding his fight alongside Naruto and Sasuke as one of the highlights.

Critics also focused on Boruto's bond with other characters, most notably his father. Chris Beveridge from the Fandom Post disliked the large focus between Naruto and Boruto's relationship on the first chapter of the Boruto manga. Viz Media senior director Kevin Hamric noted that while he initially displays a lazy demeanor, Boruto seeks fight and surpass his father. Sam Stewart from IGN felt Boruto's personality was "far less enthused" as the reviewer commented he found the character's dislike toward his father misguided and finding types of stories too common in fiction. Melina Dargis liked how Boruto realizes his father's goals and joins Sasuke and the Kages in order to save Naruto. Additionally, Dargis noted Boruto's early strained relationship with his father as well as his use of technology to fight might reflect on modern audiences who might understand his character more as a result. Rebecca Silverman from Anime News Network praised how the writers manage to develop Boruto's angst without coming across as "teen whining" and how Sasuke Uchiha decides to train him upon seeing his similarities with his father. The misrelationship Boruto forms with his adoptive brother Kawaki was seen as a striking rivalry similar to the one his father had with Sasuke in the first series. Beveridge enjoyed the foreshadow of an older Boruto on a fight against Kawaki in the series' pilot chapter, looking forward to their development.

Journalists also focused on Boruto's voice actresses. Toon Zone enjoyed Miller's performance as Boruto for making him a come across as a believable male character despite the actress being female. On the other hand, Yuko Sanpei's performance was criticized for giving a pitch equal to that of Junko Takeuchi's Naruto despite the latter being an adult. The New York Times claimed that it was common that young male characters were voiced by women citing other characters with English actresses including Goku from Dragon Ball and Monkey D. Luffy from One Piece. Miller also noted that while her character was initially polarizing to viewers due to Boruto not being aware of his father's past, he still acted as realistic child and often showed signs of affection ever since his introduction in the 2015 movie where he cries in joy when being motivated by him. Anime News Network also praised Amanda C. Miller's role as Boruto's English actor, but feeling the voice often sounded more feminine than his Japanese counterpart.

Popularity
Theatergoers for the Boruto film were given two different types of fans with one of them using Boruto and Naruto's images. Boruto's entire clothing is also being sold as merchandising. Although Hiroshi Matsuyama received a number of requests in 2019 from fans to develop another Storm game, he said that it was the final game of the series. He said that Bandai Visual would decide if a new series of games, focused on Boruto, should be developed. In a popularity poll of the 2015 movie, Boruto was voted as the third best character behind Mitsuki and Sarada. In poll from 2021, Boruto took the top place. Denki Kaminarimon's voice actress, Chihiro Ikki, said she liked how Boruto protects Denki from bullies in the series' beginning having once being bullied when she was younger and saw Boruto as an ideal hero.

See also

References

Child characters in anime and manga
Comics characters introduced in 2014
Fictional attempted suicides
Fictional avatars
Fictional characters who can duplicate themselves
Fictional characters with air or wind abilities
Fictional characters with electric or magnetic abilities
Fictional characters with water abilities
Fictional swordfighters in anime and manga
Fictional ninja
Male characters in anime and manga
Naruto characters